Torino Lingotto railway station is one of the main stations serving the city and comune of Turin, capital of the region of Piedmont, northwestern Italy.  The Torino Lingotto metro station is located nearby, and opened on March 6, 2011.

Opened in 1960, the station is the third most important in Turin, after Torino Porta Nuova and Torino Porta Susa.  It forms part of the Turin–Genoa main line, and is also a stop on three secondary railways, which link Turin with Pinerolo, Cuneo and Savona, respectively.

The station is managed by Rete Ferroviaria Italiana (RFI). Most train services are operated by Trenitalia.  Each of these companies is a subsidiary of Ferrovie dello Stato (FS), Italy's state-owned rail company.  The remaining train services are operated by GTT, a public benefit corporation responsible for public transportation in the provinces of Turin, Alessandria, Cuneo and Asti, and Arenaways, an open-access railway operator that began passenger operations in November 2010.

Location
Torino Lingotto railway station is situated in Via Mario Pannunzio, in the district of Lingotto, to the south east of Turin's city centre.  It is near the well known former FIAT car factory also named Lingotto, and the Arco olimpico, symbol of the 2006 Winter Olympics.

History
The station was founded in 1960 as a railway stop without a passenger building.  The facility was later transformed into a station equipped with a building suitable for accommodating both departing and arriving passengers.

With the increase in the number of trains passing through daily (from 240 to 270 in just a few years), it was decided in 1970 to extend the double-track section from Lingotto to Trofarello railway station, on the Turin-Genoa railway.

The 1960 passenger building was demolished in 1980 to make way for the current passenger building, which was opened in 1984.

Facilities
The station has eleven through tracks and seven platform tracks, divided into two groups: northern section (four tracks) and southern section (three tracks).

Lingotto station on the Metropolitana di Torino (Turin Metro) was opened nearby on March 6, 2011.

Future
The station is the subject of local government studies, given its growing importance to the southern part of the city.

The assumed reduction in future capacity of Torino Porta Nuova may further increase the station's importance. Local governments are working on the possible integration and synergy with the former Lingotto factory complex.

On 20 November 2007, the architect Massimiliano Fuksas submitted a preliminary project commissioned by the Piedmont Region for the redevelopment of the Via Nizza area, which previously housed the now demolished factories of Fiat Aviazione. The subsequently approved plan included construction of a new Piedmont Region Headquarters within a 686 ft skyscraper, currently set to open in 2022.

Services
The station is served by the following services:

High speed services (Frecciabianca) Turin - Allesandria - Genova - La Spezia - Pisa - Livorno - Rome
Intercity services Turin – Asti – Alessandria – Genoa - La Spezia - Pisa - Livorno - Rome - Naples - Salerno
Intercity services Turin – Asti – Alessandria – Bologna – Rimini – Ancona – Pescara – Foggia – Bari – Brindisi – Lecce
Night train (Intercity Notte) Turin - Alessandria - Bolgona - Ancona - Pescara - Foggia - Bari - Brindisi - Lecce
Night train (Intercity Notte) Turin - Genoa - La Spezia - Pisa - Livorno - Rome - Naples - Salerno
Regional services (Treno regionale) Turin – Asti – Alessandria – Ronco – Genoa
Regional services (Treno regionale) Turin - Chivasso - Santhià - Biella
Turin Metropolitan services (SFM3) Bardonecchia - Bussoleno - Turin
Turin Metropolitan services (SFM3) Susa - Bussoleno - Turin
Turin Metropolitan services (SFM1) Rivarolo - Turin - Chieri
Turin Metropolitan services (SFM2) Pinerolo - Turin - Chivasso
Turin Metropolitan services (SFM4) Turin - Alba
Turin Metropolitan services (SFM6) Turin - Asti
Turin Metropolitan services (SFM7) Fossano - Turin

Interchange and connections
The station offers interchange with urban bus lines 14, 41, 63, 63/ and 74.  It also offers a connection to the Lingotto metro station.

See also

 Railway stations in Turin
 History of rail transport in Italy
 Rail transport in Italy
 Railway stations in Italy
 Turin metropolitan railway service
 Lingotto (Turin Metro)

References

External links

This article is based upon a translation of the Italian language version, and incorporates information from the German language version, as at February 2011.

Lingotto
Railway stations opened in 1960